Luigi Rossi (born 8 June 1933) is a former Italian sport shooter twice European Champion at individual senior level.

Achievements

References

External links
 

1933 births
Living people
Trap and double trap shooters
Italian male sport shooters